Matthias Henze is the Isla Carroll and Perry E. Turner Professor of Hebrew Bible and Early Judaism at Rice University in Houston, Texas.

Early life and education
Matthias Henze was born in Hanover, Germany. Initially he studied at Theological Colloquium, Kirchliche Hochschule Bethel, Germany in 1986. Henze earned a Master of Divinity in Protestant Theology in 1992 from the University of Heidelberg, Germany, after which he emigrated to the United States. There he studied for a Ph.D. at Harvard University's Department of Near Eastern Languages and Civilizations.

Career
After earning his doctorate in 1997, Henze joined Rice University's Department of Religion. He eventually became their Isla Carroll and Perry E. Turner Professor of Hebrew Bible and Early Judaism.

He has interests in the Hebrew Bible/Old Testament, Second Temple Jewish literature and culture, apocalyptic literature, Syriac language and literature, and the Qumran fragments. Additional he follows the history of biblical interpretation. Prominent also are his studies in 'Apocrypha' and 'Pseudepigrapha' writings.

Henze has authored and edited nine books. His most recent published research includes a monograph on 2 Baruch, a Jewish apocalypse from the late first century, titled Jewish Apocalypticism in Late First Century Israel: Reading Second Baruch in Context (Mohr Siebeck, 2011). He has written many scholarly articles, book chapters and encyclopedia entries. Currently he is working on a critical commentary on Second Baruch (CEJL; De Gruyter).

Works

Books

Articles

References

Living people
German biblical scholars
Old Testament scholars
Heidelberg University alumni
Harvard University alumni
Rice University faculty
Writers from Hanover
Year of birth missing (living people)
German emigrants to the United States